Vladimir Mikhailovich Draganer (born March 2, 1981), known as The Kamyshin Maniac, is a Ukrainian-Russian serial killer who committed his crimes in the city of Kamyshin, Volgograd Oblast.

Biography 
Vladimir Draganer was born on March 2, 1981, in the village of Liubashivka, Odessa Oblast. Later on, he and his mother moved to the city of Kamyshin, where they settled on Bazarov Street. As a child, his mother humiliated him and severely beat Draganer for the slightest offense. After graduating from school, Draganer entered Vocational School Number 14, where he studied in the Crime Commission. He dreamed of serving in the Russian Armed Forces, wanting to learn to use weapons without fear, using them to kill people, which was one of the reasons he committed his later murders.

Since March 8, 1999, Draganer committed three murders of girls with extreme cruelty, inflicting over 50 stab wounds on one of his victims. However, he never raped or robbed his victims, taking only symbolic things (such as jewelry) as trophies. In the summer of 1999, for the first time, one of the victims survived his attacks and gave a description of the criminal to the police, but that didn't help the investigators.

Draganer also killed two young people. His accomplices in these crimes were acquaintances from the vocational school: Pavel Ivannikov, Alexey Kozlov and brothers Alexander and Dmitry Shubin. At first, Draganer proposed killing a fellow student who, according to his friends, "terrorized" them. The student was taken out on a fishing trip, where he was beaten unconscious. He was then tied up, with a piece of iron tied to his foot, and thrown into the Volga River. After some time, the corpse surfaced - in the ACT's reports, he was listed as unidentified.

One day, one of Draganer's friends, Ivan, saw blood-stained clothes on him and asked if he was the Kamyshin Maniac, whom everyone is looking for. In Draganer's own words, Ivan signed his death sentence. Draganer and his accomplices beat him in cold blood and, having tied him up, took Ivan along a dirt road leading to the village of Sestrenka, to plantations near the military unit area. A grave was dug there, into which the victim was thrown and subsequently shot by Draganer. After killing him, the criminals filled up the grave. The friend was soon pronounced missing, with his case photographs provided by relatives ending up on the table of the same investigator who was on the Kamyshing Maniac case.

In late August 1999, the surviving victim accidentally noticed a photograph on the investigator's desk, in which the missing Ivan was in frame along with his buddy Vladimir Draganer, identifying the latter was the man who had attacked her. He was quickly detained while in the military, in the draft board. Draganer immediately admitted committing all of the crimes and implicated his accomplices, also accusing his mother of instilling a hatred of women in him. He had dreamed of taking revenge since childhood, so he killed his first victim on International Women's Day.

The subsequent forensic psychiatric examination concluded that Draganer was sane, did not suffer from a mental disorder and was clearly aware of his actions. On July 18, 2001, he was given life imprisonment by the Volgograd Regional Court. His accomplices were sentenced to similar long terms of imprisonment.

He was sent to serve his sentence in the Black Dolphin Prison, in Orenburg Oblast.

External links 
 Episode "Dracula" from "Outlaw" series.
 Episode "Dracula's Heir" from the series "The Price of Love".

See also
 List of Russian serial killers

References 

1981 births
Inmates of Black Dolphin Prison
Living people
Male serial killers
People convicted of murder by Russia
People from Kamyshin
People from Odesa Oblast
Prisoners and detainees of Russia
Russian serial killers
Ukrainian emigrants to Russia